Emmanuel "Manny" Quezada is a Dominican-American basketball player who last played for US Monastir.

Career

After playing at NCAA with San Francisco University, Quezada started his career in 2010 in the Dominican Republic, where he played for Tiburones de Puerto Plata in the Liga Nacional de Baloncesto.

In summer 2010, Quezada leaves his country and signs for Spanish second division squad Baloncesto León, where he spends two seasons being one of the top scorers of the league.

In August 2012, he joins the Liga ACB, Spanish top league, with one of the most classic teams in Spain: FIATC Joventut.

In his first game at Liga ACB, he becomes the MVP of the week after scoring 27 points in Joventut's win against Lagun Aro GBC by 89–73.

After the injury of the Brazilian player Fúlvio in November 2013, playing for São José Basketball, at NBB, Manny was hired to replace him in this team.

The Basketball Tournament (TBT)
In the summer of 2017, Quezada competed in The Basketball Tournament on ESPN for the Talladega Knights. Competing for the $2 million grand prize, Quezada scored 16 points, grabbed five rebounds and dished out three assists in the Knights' 78-74 first round loss to Paul's Champion's; a team led by former NBA point guard Earl Boykins.  Quezada also played for Talladega during the summer of 2016. In two games, he averaged a team-high 29.5 points, 4.5 assists and 3.5 rebounds as the Knights fell to the City of Gods in the second round.

References

External links
Profile at ACB.com
Profile at FEB.es
Profile at Eurobasket.com

1985 births
Living people
US Monastir basketball players
Basketball players from New York City
American sportspeople of Dominican Republic descent
Dominican Republic men's basketball players
American expatriate basketball people in Angola
American expatriate basketball people in Spain
Atlético Petróleos de Luanda basketball players
San Francisco Dons men's basketball players
Baloncesto León players
Joventut Badalona players
Liga ACB players
Novo Basquete Brasil players
Small forwards
St. Albans School (Washington, D.C.) alumni
American men's basketball players